Yessongs is the first live album by the English progressive rock band Yes, released as a triple album in May 1973 on Atlantic Records. After completing their Close to the Edge Tour in April 1973, the band selected live recordings between February and December 1972 on their tours supporting Fragile (1971) and Close to the Edge (1972) for a live album release. They were then edited and remixed with their producer and live sound mixer Eddy Offord. Three tracks feature original Yes drummer Bill Bruford while the remaining tracks feature his replacement, Alan White.

Yessongs received a mostly positive reception from music critics, though much of its criticism was directed at its sound quality. However, the album was a commercial success for the band, reaching number 7 on the UK Albums Chart and number 12 on the US Billboard 200. In 1998, the album was certified platinum by the Recording Industry Association of America (RIAA) for selling over one million copies in the United States. In 2015, recordings of seven shows from late 1972, including ones that were used in the original album, were released in their entirety as Progeny: Seven Shows from Seventy-Two.

Background and recording
In September 1971, the Yes line-up of singer Jon Anderson, bassist Chris Squire, drummer Bill Bruford, guitarist Steve Howe, and newcomer keyboardist Rick Wakeman embarked on their Fragile Tour in support of the band's fourth studio album, Fragile (1971). The tour saw the band play across the United Kingdom, the United States, and Europe until March 1972. Following the recording of their fifth studio album, Close to the Edge (1972), the band resumed as a live act on 30 July 1972 to support the album. The tour saw the debut of drummer Alan White in the band after Bruford left when recording for the album had finished. His departure came eleven days prior to the tour's start, leaving White to learn the band's repertoire in three days. The tour ended in April 1973, by which time Yes had made additional live recordings. Yes manager Brian Lane said that people had started to think that the group were a "studio band" and were unable to reproduce what they recorded in the studio on stage, which became a reason for putting out a live album.

The Fragile and Close to the Edge tours had producer and engineer Eddy Offord travelling with the band as their live sound mixer who operated a sound system developed by the Clair Brothers. In addition, co-founder Roy Clair assisted with the operation of the system, and Geoff Haslam was hired as the recording engineer alongside assistant Mike Dunn to work on Yessongs. As Offord was in charge of the band's sound on stage, he could not operate the recording equipment at the same time. This resulted in recordings that he was disappointed with as they were substandard. When it was time for the album to be edited and remixed, Offord and the band retreated to studio 2 at Advision Studios in Fitzrovia, London to complete it. Howe recalled the group treated the mixing process with as much care and importance as one of their studio albums with careful consideration to the preparation of the various edits and the finished product.

Dates and locations

The liner notes do not list recording dates or locations, but audio comparisons of the album and the live box set Progeny: Seven Shows from Seventy-Two (2015) can be made, in addition to the soundtrack to the Yessongs concert film. They are:

19 and/or 23 February 1972 at the Academy of Music in New York City – "Perpetual Change" and "Long Distance Runaround"/"The Fish (Schindleria Praematurus)"
1 November 1972 at Ottawa Civic Centre in Ottawa, Ontario – "Roundabout"
12 November 1972 at Greeensboro Coliseum in Greensboro, North Carolina – "Heart of the Sunrise", "And You and I", the second half of "I've Seen All Good People"
15 November 1972 at Knoxville Civic Coliseum in Knoxville, Tennessee – "Siberian Khatru", the first two thirds of "Excerpts from 'The Six Wives of Henry VIII'", "Yours Is No Disgrace"
20 November 1972 at Nassau Coliseum in Uniondale, New York – "Opening (Excerpt from 'Firebird Suite')", the final third of "Excerpts from 'The Six Wives of Henry VIII'", "Mood for a Day"
15 and/or 16 December 1972 at the Rainbow Theatre in Finsbury Park, London – "Close to the Edge", "Starship Trooper"

Songs
Yessongs begins with "Opening (Excerpt from 'Firebird Suite)", the closing section to the orchestral work The Firebird by Russian composer Igor Stravinsky. Yes have used the piece as the introductory music to most of their concerts since 1971, the year of the composer's death. The track segues into "Siberian Khatru" from Close to the Edge. "Perpetual Change" and "Long Distance Runaround"/"The Fish (Schindleria Praematurus)" were recorded during the Fragile Tour with Bruford on drums, and feature extended solos from Howe, Bruford and Squire compared to the studio versions. "Excerpts from 'The Six Wives of Henry VIII is a keyboard solo spot of excerpts from Wakeman's first solo album The Six Wives of Henry VIII (1973), which he recorded during the Fragile and Close to the Edge tours and features Howe, Squire, Bruford, and White. The solo is preceded by Anderson singing notes from the opening of another Stravinsky orchestral piece, The Rite of Spring.

Artwork

The album was originally presented in a gatefold sleeve with artwork designed and illustrated by the band's longtime associate, artist Roger Dean. His brother Martyn was responsible for its layout and additional photography, featuring shots of each member performing in concert. Dean described the album as "the most elaborate and complex package" of his career at the time, which consisted of three albums worth of artwork and a booklet. The large space for Dean's work allowed him to continue a theme that "implied a story" that he introduced on the cover of Fragile, which portrays a planet breaking into pieces and a spacecraft in flight. The narrative was continued on the sleeve of Close to the Edge. Dean recalled that talks about the artwork for Yessongs were scarce until he presented the group with a rough version of his "Pathways" painting, which was well received and influenced his decision to continue the narrative. However, Dean had to redesign a new broken planet to the one on Fragile as the pieces of land that break off were too square shaped, so the pieces seen on Yessongs are more triangular. The gatefold design involved complex paper folding that Dean described as "a way of going from gatefold to any number of pages, folded out of one piece of card", and resulted in Dean and his printers, Tinsley Robor, filing a patent for that way of folding. Further development of the technique was cut short due to a subsequent national paper shortage.

The first painting, named "Escape", shows the spacecraft and a planetary fragment drifting through space in the search for a new world. "Arrival" depicts these fragments landing in the waters of the new world, with "Awakening" showing signs of new life starting, including plant and animal species. The final image, "Pathways", depicts the emergence of civilisation with a city in the background. The version with the girl sitting on top of the pathway structure was not in the original, and was painted separately and added later at the printing stage. While Dean was working on "Pathways", his cat walked across the canvas whilst still wet and its paw prints can be seen in the sky area. Dean attempted to disguise them as clouds, but it failed to produce the desired results and he kept them in. After it was photographed for the sleeve, Dean's cat urinated on the painting as it was standing against a wall, causing Dean to paint a new version that he said "looked quite different" to the version photographed.

In June 2013, Dean filed a $50 million lawsuit against director James Cameron for copyright and contributory infringement and unjust enrichment, claiming the design of Pandora, a fictional setting in Cameron's epic science fiction film Avatar (2009) and the highest-grossing film at the time, was based on Dean's paintings including "Pathways" and used without permission. The lawsuit was thrown out by judge Jesse M. Furman
in September 2014 who disagreed and believed the court found no substantial similarities between the film and Dean's artwork.

Release

Yessongs was released in May 1973; its release in the United States was on 4 May. It was originally planned for release in February 1973, prior to the start of the band's early 1973 North American tour, but delays in printing its cover led to its release pushed back. The band and Lane agreed to take a cut in royalties generated from the album so it could be sold at a lower price.

It peaked at number 7 on the UK Albums Chart and number 12 on the US Billboard 200. On 2 June 1973, the American magazine Cash Box reported that the album had reached gold certification by the Recording Industry Association of America (RIAA) for selling 500,000 copies in the US. In 1998, the album was certified platinum for shipping one million copies, becoming one of the band's highest selling records.

In an overall positive review for The Los Angeles Times, Richard Cromelin said that although some of the live renditions are sub-par to their studio versions, it presented some "excellent and rarely-heard pieces" that make the listener "really feel the people behind the music" which in turn makes up for the "occasional sloppiness". Cromelin praised the album for the "stunning improvisations" and interplay within the band which dispels those who criticise Yes for being "dry and mechanical". Variety published a positive review, noting the album shows the band at "their exciting best". Band biographer Tim Morse thought the album's downfall was its substandard audio quality despite the band's strong performances.

Reissues
Yessongs has been reissued several times:

 1987 – 2-disc reissue on Atlantic Records
 1994 – 2-disc remaster by Joe Gastwirt on Atlantic Records
 2001 – 3-disc HDCD reissue by Isao Kikuchi on Warner Music Japan
 2009 – 2-disc SHM-CD remaster by Isao Kikuchi on Warner Music Japan
 2013 – 2-disc SACD reissue as part of the High Vibration – SACD Box set on Rhino Records

Track listing

Personnel
Credits are adapted from the album's 1973 and 1994 liner notes.

Yes
 Jon Anderson – lead vocals
 Chris Squire – bass guitar, backing vocals
 Steve Howe – electric and acoustic guitars, backing vocals
 Rick Wakeman – keyboards
 Bill Bruford – drums on "Perpetual Change", "Long Distance Runaround", and "The Fish (Schindleria Praematurus)"
 Alan White – drums on all other tracks

Production
 Yes – production
 Eddie Offord – production
 Geoff Haslam – recording engineer
 Mike Dunn – assistant engineer
 Roger Dean – cover design and illustration
 Martin Dean – photographs and layout
 David "Groucho" Gair – additional photographs
 Brian Lane – co-ordination

Chart performance

Certifications

References

Books

DVD media

Yes (band) live albums
Albums with cover art by Roger Dean (artist)
Albums produced by Eddy Offord
1973 live albums
Atlantic Records live albums